Hubert Lyle Barker (November 11, 1918 – April 6, 1994) was a professional American football player who played linebacker for four seasons for the New York Giants.

References

External links
 

1918 births
American football linebackers
New York Giants players
Arkansas Razorbacks football players
1994 deaths
People from Craig County, Oklahoma
Players of American football from Oklahoma